Mali Grđevac is a village in the municipality Veliki Grđevac, Bjelovar-Bilogora County in Croatia. According to the 2001 census, there are 13 inhabitants, in 8 of family households.

References 

Populated places in Bjelovar-Bilogora County